Marcos Giffoni de Melo Gomes (born July 26, 1984) is a Brazilian professional racing driver currently set to compete in the Stock Car Brasil series for Cavaleiro Sports, where he won the 2015 championship. Marcos is the son of four-time Stock Car champion Paulo Gomes and brother of the also racing driver Pedro Gomes.

Racing career
On July 5, 2009 he won the fifth round of the season at Interlagos by Action Power, winning their fourth win in the category. At dawn on July 6, soon after the victory at Interlagos, the truck of Action Power team had an accident on the Highway Régis Bittencourt, destroying all the equipment including the car of Marcos Gomes. On occurred, the team officially announced that he was out of the season. Gomes joined RCM Motorsport for the rest of the season, but the team stayed with the Action Power name. In 2012, Gomes was suspended for six months after he failed a drug test.

Racing record

Career summary

Complete Stock Car Brasil results

NASCAR
(key) (Bold – Pole position awarded by qualifying time. Italics – Pole position earned by points standings or practice time. * – Most laps led.)

K&N Pro Series East

 Season still in progress
 Ineligible for series points

Complete 24 Hours of Le Mans results

Complete FIA World Endurance Championship results
(key) (Races in bold indicate pole position) (Races in italics indicate fastest lap)

References

External links

1984 births
Living people
Brazilian racing drivers
Stock Car Brasil drivers
TC 2000 Championship drivers
Racing drivers from São Paulo
24 Hours of Daytona drivers
24 Hours of Le Mans drivers
Brazilian WeatherTech SportsCar Championship drivers
Brazilian Formula Renault 2.0 drivers
North American Formula Renault drivers
Doping cases in auto racing
Brazilian sportspeople in doping cases
Brazilian NASCAR drivers
NASCAR drivers
FIA World Endurance Championship drivers
European Le Mans Series drivers
Asian Le Mans Series drivers
Aston Martin Racing drivers
Piquet GP drivers